St. Paul's Parish Church may refer to:

St. Paul's Parish Church (Batesville, Arkansas), listed on the NRHP in Arkansas
St. Paul's Parish Church (Brandywine, Maryland), listed on the NRHP in Maryland
St. Paul's Parish Church (Malden, Massachusetts), listed on the NRHP in Massachusetts